Susan Irene Glover (born January 14, 1957) is a Canadian actress, best known for playing Sarah in Naked Josh. She is also known for voicing Mrs. Wood in Arthur, Izabella Dehavalot in Amazon Jack, Mrs. Schuman in Spaced Out, Mrs. Larkin in later episodes of What's With Andy? (2003–2007), Tubby's mom in The Little Lulu Show, Lucille in Samurai Pizza Cats, General Jinjur in the 1986 anime The Wonderful Wizard of Oz and Miss Dalee in My Goldfish is Evil.

She also played Ms. Noelle Atoll on the television series Radio Active and has made appearances in several films, specials, and television programmes.

Career
Prior to film acting, Glover began her career doing improvisational theatre with companies such as Albert Nerenberg's Theatre Shmeatre, Acme Harpoon Co., and La Ligue National d'Improvisation. She has since appeared in theatres across Canada including, Montreal's Centaur Theatre, Ottawa's Great Canadian Theatre Company and the National Arts Center, and Calgary's Alberta Theatre Projects. Her stage roles included the 1993 production of Peter Cureton's Passages.

She is sometimes credited as Suzanne Glover. She currently lives in Montreal, Quebec.

Filmography

Film
 The Audrey Hepburn Story – English Actress
 Barnum – Queen Victoria
 The Bend – Mrs. MacDonald
 Criminal Law – Reporter
 Dead Innocent – Rosa
 Dead Like Me: Life After Death – Hudson's Mother
 Dr. Jekyll and Ms. Hyde – Nose
 False Pretenses – Art Collector
 For Hire – Dr. Peterson's Receptionist
 Going to Kansas City – Teri Kolchek
 Heart: The Marilyn Bell Story – Phyllis Rider
 Hysteria – Mrs. Schmidt
 I Do (But I Don't) – Sales Lady
 I'm Not There – Mrs. Peacock
 Isn't She Great – Sally Mae
 Jack and Ella – Alice
 Jericho Mansions – Valda
 Living with the Enemy – Tonya
 Malarek – Barmaid
 Missing – Alice's Mother
 The Peacekeeper – Presidential Aide #2
 Prom Wars – Ms. Hawthorne
 Rainbow – Flower Box Woman
 Random Encounter – Judy Grant
 The Reagans – Helene
 Revenge of the Land – Margaret
 Satan's School for Girls – Mrs. Hammersmith
 Savage Messiah – Rod's Wife
 The Secret – Condescending Woman
 Stardom – Guest appearance
 The Struggle – Mrs. Hull
 Suspicious Minds – Candy
 Ten Days to Victory – Gerda's Mother
 Two Thousand and None – Wife
 Vendetta II: The New Mafia – Dr. McMain
 Wall of Secrets – Amelie Martell
 Wargames: The Dead Code – Gail Farmer

Television
 11 Somerset – Caller #1
 Are You Afraid of the Dark? – Olga, Parasol Lady
 Happy Castle – Lolita (voice)
 Heritage Minutes, "Wilder Penfield" – Patient with epilepsy
 Killer Wave – Red Cross Doctor
 Naked Josh – Sarah
 Nuremberg – Emmy Goering
 Radio Active – Noelle Attoll
 Seriously Weird – Ms. Pembleton
 Sirens – Mrs. Basinger
 Urban Myth Chillers – Nurse #2

Animation
 Animal Crackers – Additional Voices
 The Animal Train – Tigress
 Around the World in 80 Dreams – Additional Voices
 Arthur – Mrs. Wood, Mrs. Powers
 The Babaloos – Mom
 The Bellflower Bunnies – Additional Voices
 Billy and Buddy – Hildegarde
 Belphegor – Additional Voices
 Bob in a Bottle – Additional Voices
 The Bush Baby – Safina
 The Busy World of Richard Scarry – Additional Voices
 Cat Tales – Cow
 Charley and Mimmo – Paula
 Chip and Charlie – Character Voice
 C.L.Y.D.E. – Additional Voices
 The Country Mouse and the City Mouse Adventures – Additional Voices
 Daft Planet – Additional Voices
 David Copperfield – Additional Voices
 Divine Fate – Character Voice
 Dog's World – Character Voice
 Dragon Hunters – Character Voice
 Eye of the Wolf – Character Voice
 Flat! – Character Voice
 Flight Squad – Character Voice
 Fred the Caveman – Additional Voices
 Go Hugo Go – Izabella Dehavalot
 Gulliver's Travels – Additional Voices
 How the Toys Saved Christmas – Alfred
 Inuk – Character Voice
 Ivanhoe – Additional Voices
 Jim Button – Additional Voices 
 Jungle Book Shōnen Mowgli – Kichi
 Jungle Tales – Character Voice
 The Kids from Room 402 – Additional Voices
 Kid Paddle – Grandma
 The Legend of White Fang – Additional Voices
 Lili's Island – Additional Voices
 The Little Lulu Show – Mrs. Tompkins
 Lucky Luke – Additional Voices
 The Magical Adventures of Quasimodo – Additional Voices
 Malo Korrigan – Additional Voices
 Marsupilami – Additional Voices
 Martin Morning – Additional Voices
 Martin Mystery – Additional Voices
 Mega Babies – Additional Voices
 Mica – Character Voices
 Mimi and Friends – Character Voice
 Momo – Additional Voices
 Mona the Vampire – Additional Voices
 Monster Buster Club – Additional Voices
 My Goldfish is Evil – Miss Dalee
 Mystery of the Maya – Narrator
 Nathaël and the Seal Hunt – Character Voice
 Night Hood – Countess May Hem
 Nutsberry Town – Cherry, Miss Apple
 Ocean Tales – Additional Voices
 Okura – Additional Voices
 Papa Beaver's Storytime – Additional Voices
 Partly Private – Narrator
 Pet Pals – Bird
 The Phoenix – Character Voice
 Pig City – Additional Voices
 Pipi, Pupu and Rosemary – Rosemary
 Pirate Family – Additional Voices
 Potatoes and Dragons – Additional Voices
 Princess Sissi – Additional Voices
 Prudence Gumshoe – Additional Voices
 The Real Story of The Three Little Kittens - Mother Cat
 Ripley's Believe It or Not! – Additional Voices
 Robinson Sucroe – Character Voice
 Rotten Ralph – Additional Voices
 Saban's Adventures of Peter Pan – Additional Voices
 Saban's Adventures of Pinocchio – Additional Voices
 Saban's Adventures of the Little Mermaid – Additional Voices
 Samurai Pizza Cats – Lucille Omitsu
 Sagwa, the Chinese Siamese Cat - Aunt Chi-Chi (uncredited)
 Sandokan – Additional Voices
 Sea Dogs – Character Voice
 The Secret World of Santa Claus – Additional Voices
 Sharky and George – Sarah Prawn
 Shaolin Kids – Character Voices
 Simon in the Land of Chalk Drawings – Additional Voices
 Spaced Out – Mrs. Schumann
 Spirou – Additional Voices
 Team S.O.S. – Character Voice
 The Tofus – Additional Voices
 Tommy and Oscar – Character Voice
 The Triplets – Character Voice
 Tripping the Rift – Additional Voices
 Tripping the Rift: The Movie – Additional Voices
 Turtle Island – Mischievous Mermaid
 The Twins – Additional Voices
 What's With Andy? – Mrs. Larkin (2003–2007)
 The World of David the Gnome – Additional Voices
 The Wonderful Wizard of Oz – General Jinjur
 X-Chromosome – Barb
 X-DuckX – Additional Voices
 Winx Club – Griselda, Diaspro (S2-3), Nebula and others 
 Wombat City – Additional Voices
 Woofy – Additional Voices
 Wunschpunsch – Additional Voices
 Yakari – Additional Voices
 Young Robin Hood – May Queen
 Zoé Kezako – Mrs. Glouton

Video Games
 Assassin's Creed – Additional Voices
 Deus Ex: Human Revolution - Athene Margoulis, Cassandra Reed
 Deus Ex: Mankind Divided - Little K
 Evolution Worlds – Anita, Secretaries #3
 Jagged Alliance – Character Voice
 Jagged Alliance 2 – Character Voice
 Laura's Happy Adventures – Carmen
 Prince of Persia: Warrior Within – Sand Warriors
 Rainbow Six 3: Black Arrow – Character Voice
 Splinter Cell – Additional Voices
 Splinter Cell: Chaos Theory – Additional Voices
 Wizardry 8 – Character Voice

Documentary
 Just For Laughs: Montreal Comedy Festival – Herself

Staff Work
 The Philosopher Stoned – Writer, Producer, Director
 The Phone Call – Stand-In: Linda Smith
 Simon in the Land of Chalk Drawings – Writer

References

External links
 

1957 births
Living people
20th-century Canadian actresses
21st-century Canadian actresses
Actresses from Montreal
Anglophone Quebec people
Canadian film actresses
Canadian television actresses
Canadian voice actresses
Canadian stage actresses
Canadian television writers
Canadian women television writers
Writers from Montreal